The Lucas L11 is a French ultralight aircraft that was designed by Emile Lucas. The aircraft is supplied in the form of plans for amateur construction.

Design and development
The aircraft was designed to comply with the Fédération Aéronautique Internationale microlight rules. It features a cantilever low-wing, a two-seats-in-side-by-side configuration enclosed cockpit, fixed tricycle landing gear and a single engine in tractor configuration.

The aircraft is made from sheet aluminum with its windshield made from a single piece of flat plastic to save money on construction costs. Access to the cockpit is via gull-winged doors. The standard recommended engine is the  Jabiru 2200 four-stroke powerplant.

Variants
L 11
Base model with a tapered wing.
L 12
Version with a rectangular wing and simplified construction, offered as a kit only.

Specifications (L11)

References

External links

2000s French ultralight aircraft
Homebuilt aircraft
Single-engined tractor aircraft
Low-wing aircraft